Cathay Pacific Flight 780 was a flight from Juanda International Airport in Surabaya, Indonesia to Hong Kong International Airport on 13 April 2010. On board were 309 passengers and a crew of 13. As Flight 780 neared Hong Kong, the crew were unable to change the thrust output of the engines. The aircraft, an Airbus A330-342, landed at almost twice the speed of a normal landing, suffering minor damage. The 57 passengers who sustained injuries were hurt in the ensuing slide evacuation; one of them received serious injuries.

The cause of the accident was contamination of the fuel taken on board at Surabaya, which gradually damaged both engines of the aircraft.

The flight's two Australian pilots, Captain Malcolm Waters and First Officer David Hayhoe, who safely landed the aircraft despite the extraordinary challenge, have been compared to pilots Chesley Sullenberger and Jeffrey Skiles of US Airways Flight 1549 the previous year (January 2009). In March 2014, the two Flight 780 pilots were awarded the Polaris Award by the International Federation of Air Line Pilots' Associations for their heroism and airmanship.

Captain Waters, who was 35 years old, had been working for Cathay Pacific for 12 years, while 37-year-old Hayhoe had been working for Cathay Pacific for 3 years and had previously served with the Royal Australian Air Force for 11 years.

Aircraft
The aircraft involved in the accident was an Airbus A330-342, registration B-HLL, manufacturer's serial number 244, fitted with Rolls-Royce Trent 772-60 engines. It first flew on 4 November 1998 and was delivered to Cathay Pacific three weeks later on 25 November 1998. This aircraft was configured for a capacity of 311 passengers and 13 crew, with 44 business-class seats and 267 economy-class seats.

After the incident, it was bought by DVB Bank in July 2011 (Arena Aviation Capital since March 2017) and was transferred to Dragonair (Cathay Dragon) since 23 April 2012 and was reconfigured for a capacity of 307 passengers, with 42 business-class seats and 265 economy-class seats in 2013. It was also repainted into the new Cathay Dragon livery on 3 November 2017. The aircraft had another incident 6 years later as flight KA691 from Hong Kong to Penang on 8 September 2016, with 295 passengers and crew on board, when an airport delivery van crashed into the aircraft's left engine.

The aircraft was withdrawn from service on August 13, 2020, in the expiration of its lease, after its last commercial flight from Beijing to Hong Kong as KA993 and its final flight was on October 14, 2020, to Pinal Airpark in Marana, Arizona, via Anchorage as KA3496. The aircraft was scrapped on site in November 2021.

Accident
Cathay Pacific Flight 780 departed from stand 8 at Juanda International Airport in Indonesia. It took off from runway 28 at 08:24 local time (01:24 UTC). During the climb, both engines experienced small engine pressure ratio  fluctuations, with No. 2 engine fluctuating over a greater range than No. 1. The crew contacted maintenance control (MC) to discuss the fluctuations. As other engine operating parameters on both engines were normal,  continuing the flight was determined to be safe.

Almost two hours after departure, at 03:16 UTC, the "ENG 2 CTL SYS FAULT" ECAM message reappeared. The crew contacted MC to review the issue. As all other engine parameters remained normal, continuing on to Hong Kong was again deemed safe.

The second message signified an engine compressor stall, a potentially serious engine problem. The flight crew accordingly carried out the necessary ECAM actions with No. 2 engine's thrust lever moved to the idle (or minimum-thrust setting) position. The crew set No. 1 engine to maximum continuous thrust to compensate for the low thrust of No. 2 engine. Following these actions, the crew declared a "pan-pan" with Hong Kong air traffic control, requesting the shortest possible route to the airport and priority landing.

The flight crew carried out the actions for a No. 1 engine compressor stall and declared a "mayday". The captain then moved the thrust levers to test engine responses. No. 1 engine's rotational fan speed slowly spooled up to about 74% N1, while No. 2 engine remained running below idle speed, about 17% N1, providing sufficient thrust to level off at 5,500 ft and reach Hong Kong. As the flight approached the airport, the crew found that movement of the thrust levers failed to reduce thrust below 74% N1 on No. 1 engine.

The plane bounced and briefly became airborne again until it slammed down hard while banking left, causing the left engine to scrape against the runway surface. Both wing spoilers deployed automatically. Only No. 1 engine's thrust reverser deployed and activated with the right engine’s thrust reverser unresponsive due to a technical snag, forcing the crew to bring the aircraft to a stop using manual braking.  remained  between 70 and 80% N1 until the crew shut down both engines upon coming to a stop.

Five of the aircraft's eight main wheel tires deflated. Airport firefighters reported that smoke and flames were emanating from the landing gear. The captain ordered an emergency evacuation, during which 57 passengers were injured, of whom 10 were transported to the hospital.

Investigations
Investigators from the Hong Kong Civil Aviation Department, the Bureau d'Enquêtes et d'Analyses pour la Sécurité de l'Aviation Civile (BEA) of France and the Air Accidents Investigation Branch (AAIB) of the United Kingdom formed a team to investigate the accident. The National Transportation Safety Committee (NTSC) of Indonesia and the National Transportation Safety Board (NTSB) of the United States of America were also involved in the investigation, as were representatives of Airbus, Rolls-Royce and Cathay Pacific.

Data from the digital flight data recorder, cockpit voice recorder and quick access recorder were downloaded for analysis. The investigation concentrated on the engines, the engine control systems and the fuel system.

Analysis of the engines found that their fuel systems were contaminated with spherical particles. The Hong Kong Civil Aviation Department Accident Investigation Division concluded that the accident was caused by these spherical particles. The contaminated fuel, which contained particles of superabsorbent polymer (SAP) introduced into the fuel system when the aircraft was fueled at Surabaya, subsequently caused the loss of thrust control on both engines of the aircraft during approach to Hong Kong.

The SAP particles, a component of the filter monitors installed in a fueling dispenser at Juanda Airport, had caused the main metering valves of the fuel metering unit to seize. The valves were found to be stuck in positions corresponding to the recorded thrust output of each engine as it approached Hong Kong. Other engine components were found to be contaminated with the particles, while the variable stator vane controller of engine No. 2 was found to be seized. The entire fuel system, including the fuel tanks, was found to be contaminated with spherical particles.

Fuel samples collected at Juanda International Airport were contaminated with the particles. The fuel supply pipeline system used to refuel aircraft at Juanda International Airport had been recently extended during construction of new aircraft parking bays. The investigation discovered that not all procedures had been followed when the system was brought back into service, and that salt water had inadvertently entered the fuel supply. The presence of salt water compromised the filter monitors in the pipeline system, releasing the SAP particles into the fuel.

Dramatization 
The incident was featured in the first episode of season 19 of the Canadian TV series Mayday labeled "Deadly Descent".

See also

 British Airways Flight 38, a Boeing 777 that lost engine power shortly before a 2008 crash-landing at London Heathrow Airport
 Air Transat Flight 236, an Airbus A330-200 that had fuel starvation before landing safely at Lajes Air Base in the Azores
 British Airways Flight 009, a Boeing 747-200 that lost power on all four engines after flying through a cloud of volcanic ash
 Qantas Flight 72, an Airbus A330-300 incident over the Pacific Ocean that presented conflicting information to the flight crew

References

External links

Aviation accidents and incidents in 2010
Aviation accidents and incidents in Hong Kong
Cathay Pacific accidents and incidents
Accidents and incidents involving the Airbus A330
2010 in Hong Kong
April 2010 events in Asia
Airliner accidents and incidents caused by engine failure